Sir George Yeardley (1587 – November 13, 1627) was a planter and colonial governor of the colony of Virginia. He was also among the first slaveowners in Colonial America. A survivor of the Virginia Company of London's ill-fated Third Supply Mission, whose flagship, the Sea Venture, was shipwrecked on Bermuda for ten months from 1609 to 1610, he is best remembered for presiding over the initial session of the first representative legislative body in Virginia in 1619. With representatives from throughout the settled portion of the colony, the group became known as the House of Burgesses. It has met continuously since, and is known in modern times as the Virginia General Assembly. Yeardley died in 1627.

Early life
Yeardley was baptized on July 28, 1588, in St. Saviour's Parish, Southwark, Surrey. He was the son of Ralph Yeardley (1549–1604), a London merchant-tailor, and Rhoda Marston (died 1603). He chose not to follow his father into trade, but instead became a soldier and joined a company of English foot-soldiers to fight the Spanish in the Netherlands. As captain of a personal bodyguard, he was selected to serve Sir Thomas Gates during his term as Governor of Virginia.

Shipwreck
Yeardley set sail from England on June 1, 1609, with the newly appointed Sir Thomas Gates aboard the Sea Venture, the flagship of the ill-fated Third Supply expedition to Jamestown. After eight weeks at sea, and seven days from expected landfall, the convoy ran into a tropical storm and the Sea Venture was shipwrecked in the Bermudas. Fortunately, everyone survived the storm. Despite numerous problems, including civil unrest among the former passengers resulting in Gates declaring martial law, two small ships were built within 10 months. The two ships, the 70–80 ton Deliverance and the 30 ton pinnace Patience, arrived at Jamestown on May 23, 1610.

Jamestown
The shipwreck survivors found the colonists of Jamestown in desperate condition. Most of the settlers had died from sickness or starvation or had been killed by Indians. Sir Thomas Gates agreed with the Jamestown settlers to abandon the colony and return to England. He ordered Captain Yeardley to command his soldiers to guard the town preventing settlers from setting fire to the structures that were evacuated. Lord de la Warr soon arrived bringing supplies to save the struggling colony. Captain Yeardley was co-commander of the early Forts Henry and Charles at Kecoughtan. In October 1610, Lord De La Warr ordered Captain Yeardley and Captain Edward Brewster to lead 150 men into the mountains in search of silver and gold mines.

Political career in the New World
In 1616 Yeardley was designated Deputy-Governor of Virginia. One of his first accomplishments was to come to an agreement with the Chickahominy Indians that secured food and peace for two years. He served from 1616 to 1617.

During November 1618, Sir George was appointed to serve three years as governor of Virginia, and was knighted by James I during an audience at Newmarket on 24 November.

Yeardley was governor of Virginia when, in August 1619, the White Lion landed "20. and odd" Angolans kidnapped in Africa and exchanged them for provisions, thus introducing the trade in enslaved Africans into the English colonies on the North American mainland.

A relation from the Flowerdew family, John Pory, served as secretary to the colony from 1618 to 1622.  And when Flowerdew Hundred sent representatives to the first General Assembly in Jamestown in 1619, one was Ensign Edmund Rossingham, a son of Temperance Flowerdew's elder sister Mary Flowerdew and her husband Dionysis Rossingham.

Yeardley led the first representative Virginia General Assembly, the legislative House of Burgesses, to meet on American soil. It convened at the church in Jamestown on July 30, 1619. One of the first acts of this representative body was to set the price of tobacco. Yeardley was appointed deputy-governor again in 1625. On September 11, 1626, Yeardley presided over the witchcraft inquiry of Joan Wright, the first legal witchcraft inquiry on record against an English settler in any British North American colony.

He served a second time as governor from March 4, 1626/27 until his death on November 13, 1627.

Land ownership

In 1619, he patented  of land on Mulberry Island. He owned another private plantation upriver on the south side of the James River opposite Tanks Weyanoke, named Flowerdew Hundred, and owned several enslaved persons. It is often assumed that Yeardley named this plantation "Flowerdew Hundred" after his wife, as a kind of romantic tribute.  However, the land appears to have been in use by Stanley Flowerdew, Yeardley's brother-in-law, before it was patented by Yeardley. Although George Yeardley acquired the thousand acres that he named Flowerdew Hundred in 1619, it seems very likely that some settlement had begun there before that date, for his brother-in-law Stanley Flowerdew took a shipment of tobacco to England in the same year, probably grown on the same property. With a population of about thirty, Flowerdew Hundred Plantation was economically successful with thousands of pounds of tobacco produced along with corn, fish and livestock.  In 1621 Yeardley paid 120 pounds (possibly a hogshead of tobacco) to build the first windmill in British America. The windmill was an English post design and was transferred by deed in the property's 1624 sale to Abraham Piersey, a Cape Merchant of the London Company. The plantation survived the 1622 onslaught of Powhatan Indians, losing only six people. so the plantation may have been associated with the Flowerdew name before Yeardley's patent.  Note that Yeardley named his Mulberry Island plantation "Stanley Hundred", undoubtedly after his Stanley in-laws.  In other words, both of Yeardley's plantations were named in honor of his wealthy in-laws.  Clearly, the Yeardley-Flowerdew alliance was as much to do with power politics and social status as with romance.

Family
On 18 October 1618, Yeardley married Temperance Flowerdew, daughter of Anthony Flowerdew of Hethersett, Norfolk, and wife Martha Stanley of Scottow, Norfolk. A month later he was appointed to serve three years as governor of Virginia, and was knighted by James I during an audience at Newmarket on 24 November.   This is the date commonly ascribed to the wedding;  however, their children were born prior to 1618.  While out-of-wedlock children occurred in early Jamestown, it would have been unthinkable for a woman of Temperance Flowerdew's station. It is likely that they got married between 1610 and 1615. Temperance Flowerdew had also sailed for Virginia in the 1609 expedition, aboard the Faulcon, arriving at Jamestown in August 1609. She was one of the few survivors of the Starving Time.

The couple had three children: 
 Elizabeth Yeardley (1615–1660).
 Argoll Yeardley (1617–1655).
 Francis Yeardley (1620–1655), "Upon reaching manhood he became quite prominent in the affairs of Virginia, being for some time a colonel of militia and in 1653 a member of the House of Burgesses for Lower Norfolk."

Death and legacy
Yeardley died on November 13, 1627. He is buried in Third Jamestown Church at Jamestown, Virginia. His widow, Temperance Flowerdew married Governor Francis West. Their son, Argoll Yeardley would represent Lower Norfolk county in the House of Burgesses in 1653, shortly before his death. Argoll Yeardly had married Ann Custis, who brought her brothers John Custis II and William Custis to the colony, where they became planters, served in the House of Burgesses, and founded the Custis family of Virginia.

In pop culture
Jason Flemyng plays Sir George Yeardley in a British television show, Jamestown written by Bill Gallagher and produced by Carnival Films, the producers of Downton Abbey. The series premiered on Sky One in the United Kingdom in May 2017. Sky ordered a second series of Jamestown in May 2017, before the premiere of the first series. Series 2 aired from February 2018. Season 3 aired in 2019.

Archaeological

On July 24, 2018, archaeologists from Jamestown Rediscovery and the Smithsonian Institution announced the discovery of a prominent burial around 400 years ago in an important spot within the church. Ground-penetrating radar confirmed the presence of a skeleton of the right age and build for Yeardley who died in 1627, aged about 40. The gender, age estimate, the way the body was laid out and its prominent location within the church, support its identity as Yeardley. Another church was built on top but the position indicates a high status burial. Although the head is missing, 10 teeth have been found and tests are being carried out by the FBI and archaeologist and geneticist Turi King, who helped identify the remains of Richard III in 2012. King will assist in tracking down Yeardley relatives to compare DNA found in the remains. The results could take several months but should be available in time for 2019's 400th Anniversary of Sir George Yeardley's Great Reforms and the first General Assembly which introduced them.

References

Sources
Deetz, James,Flowerdew Hundred: the Archaeology of a Virginia Plantation 1619-186. (Charlottesville: University of Virginia Press, 1993).
Hatch, Charles E., The First Seventeen Years: Virginia, 1607–1624 (Charlottesville: University of Virginia Press, 1957).
Dorman, J.F., ed., Adventures of Purse and Person, Virginia 1607-1624/5 (Alexandria: Order of First Families of Virginia, 1987).
Hume, Ivor Noël, The Virginia Adventure. New York, Alfred A. Knopf. 1994).
Kolb, Avery, "The Tempest",
American Heritage: Four Hundred Years of American Seafaring, April/May 1983.
"Wreck and Redemption", The Web of Time: Pages from the American Past, Issue Two, Fall 1998.
"Francis Yeardley's Narrative of Excursions into Carolina, 1654," in Narratives of early Carolina, 1650–1708, ed. A.S. Salley, (New York, C. Scribner's Sons, 1911), 21–29

External links
 Archaeologists have found the remains of one of Jamestown’s early settlers. Now they have to prove he is who they think he is.
http://www.virginia.org/johnsmithtrail/
http://www.cr.nps.gov/nr/ 
http://www.jamestowne.org/

1587 births
1627 deaths
James River (Virginia)
Colonial governors of Virginia
People from Southwark
Shipwreck survivors
Castaways
Burials at Jamestown Church
Knights Bachelor
English emigrants